Dame Jennifer Mary Shipley  (née Robson; born 4 February 1952) is a New Zealand former politician who served as the 36th prime minister of New Zealand from 1997 to 1999. She was the first female prime minister of New Zealand, and the first woman to have led the National Party.

Shipley was born in Gore, Southland. She grew up in rural Canterbury, and attended Marlborough Girls' College and the Christchurch College of Education. Before entering politics, she worked as a schoolteacher and was involved with various community organisations. Shipley was elected to Parliament at the 1987 election, winning the Ashburton electorate (later renamed Rakaia). When the National Party returned to power in 1990, she was appointed to Cabinet under Jim Bolger. Shipley subsequently served as Minister of Social Welfare (1990–1996), Minister for Women's Affairs (1990–1996), Minister of Health (1993–1996), and Minister of Transport (1996–1997).

In December 1997, Bolger resigned as Prime Minister after losing the confidence of his party. Shipley was elected as his replacement unopposed. She inherited an uneasy coalition with New Zealand First, led by Winston Peters. The coalition was dissolved in August 1998, but Shipley was able to remain in power with the aid of Mauri Pacific, an NZ First splinter group. At the 1999 election, her government was defeated by the Labour Party, led by Helen Clark. Shipley continued as Leader of the Opposition until October 2001. Shipley has involved herself with business and charitable interests since leaving politics, and is a member of the Council of Women World Leaders.

Early life
Born in Gore, New Zealand, Shipley was one of four sisters. After attending Marlborough Girls' College, she qualified in 1971 as a teacher through the Christchurch College of Education and taught in New Zealand primary schools until 1976. In 1973 she married Burton Shipley and settled in Ashburton.

Member of Parliament

Having joined the National Party in 1975, Shipley successfully stood in Ashburton, a safe National seat in the country areas surrounding Christchurch, in the 1987 election.  Entering parliament at age 35, she was one of parliament's youngest members.

Cabinet Minister
Shipley rose quickly in the National caucus. In February 1990, while still in her first term, party leader Jim Bolger named her the party's spokeswoman on social welfare. When Bolger led the National Party to victory in the 1990 general election, Shipley was reelected in Rakaia, essentially a reconfigured Ashburton. She became Minister of Social Welfare, and also served as Minister for Women's Affairs (1990–1996).

In her role as Minister of Social Welfare, Shipley presided over sharp cutbacks to state benefits. Later, when she became Minister of Health in 1993, she caused further controversy by attempting to reform the public health service, introducing an internal market. National won another term at the 1996 election, but was forced into a coalition with New Zealand First. Shipley left the Women's Affairs portfolio and took on several others, including responsibility for state-owned enterprises and transport.

In 1993, Shipley was awarded the New Zealand Suffrage Centennial Medal.

Prime Minister

Shipley grew increasingly frustrated and disillusioned with the cautious pace of National's leader, Jim Bolger, and with what she saw as the disproportionate influence of New Zealand First. She began gathering support to replace Bolger in mid-1997. Later that year, while Bolger attended the Commonwealth Heads of Government Meeting, Shipley convinced a majority of her National Party colleagues to back her bid for the leadership. Bolger returned to New Zealand and discovered that he no longer had the support of his party. Rather than face being voted out, he resigned, and Shipley replaced him. As leader of the governing party, she became Prime Minister on 8 December 1997. On 21 May 1998 Shipley was appointed to the Privy Council and became The Right Honourable Jenny Shipley.

Despite continued economic growth, the Shipley government became increasingly politically unstable. In particular, the relationship between National and New Zealand First deteriorated. While Bolger had been able to maintain good relations with New Zealand First and with its leader, Deputy Prime Minister Winston Peters, the alliance became strained after Shipley rose to power. Finally, on 14 August 1998, Shipley sacked Peters from Cabinet.

Shipley was nicknamed "the perfumed steamroller," when she first became prime minister. During a later interview with Guyon Espiner, Shipley stated that female politicians were labelled differently in the media; she uses the example that male politicians are called bold where female politicians are called vindictive; although she notes that this is an observation, not something that hurts her personally. Shipley's ascension to the leadership marked a shift to the right politically with subtle returns to the neo-liberal policies of the first term of the Bolger government. This was labelled by some commentators (usually critically) as "Jennycide", a portmanteau of "Jenny" and "genocide".

Shipley, along with the New Zealand Tourism Board, backed the quasi-national emblem of the silver fern on a black background as a possible alternative flag, along the lines of the Canadian flag, but she took pains to publicly dissociate herself from Bolger's support for republicanism. As the debate continued in 1999, the Princess Royal visited New Zealand, and Shipley stated, "I am an unashamed royal supporter, along with many New Zealanders". However, the debate was muted by the controversy surrounding Tourism Board contracts going to the public-relations firm Saatchi & Saatchi, whose World CEO Kevin Roberts, also an advocate of the silver fern flag, was a good friend of Shipley.

The APEC Summit was hosted in Auckland in September 1999. Shipley met with the President of the United States, Bill Clinton, in one of only two state visits to New Zealand by a US President.

Shipley was the first Prime Minister to attend the gay and lesbian Hero Parade, being the first National Party leader to seek to make electoral overtures to the gay and lesbian voting public. She advocated lowering the alcohol purchase age from 20 to 18 and achieved this in 1999. This was part of her expressed desire to expand the traditional National Party voting base.

Shipley became a member of the Council of Women World Leaders, an international network of current and former women presidents and prime ministers.

Defeat and resignation
Shipley led the National Party into the 1999 election, hoping to become the first woman to be elected prime minister in her own right. However, she was defeated by the Labour Party, also led by a woman, Helen Clark. This election was a significant moment in history for New Zealand as it was the first New Zealand election in which the leaders of both major parties were women.

Shipley served as the Leader of the Opposition until October 2001, when Bill English took over as National Party leader. She retired from Parliament in January 2002.

In the 2003 New Year Honours, Shipley was appointed a Distinguished Companion of the New Zealand Order of Merit, for services as a Member of Parliament.

Health
Shipley suffered a heart attack in 2000, leading to an emergency angioplasty procedure. She made modifications to her lifestyle and lost weight, though she was diagnosed with diabetes in 2004. She underwent gastric bypass surgery in late 2007.

Life after politics

Since leaving politics, Shipley has involved herself with various business and charitable interests. In 2007, she joined the financial services firm Source Sentinel, and in 2009, she was appointed chair of the Genesis Energy Limited board. , she was on the board of the New Zealand branch of the state-owned China Construction Bank. In December 2012, Shipley resigned from the board of directors of Mainzeal Property & Construction (MPCL), which went into receivership on 6 February 2013. At mid-day on 5 February 2013 she was one of four independent directors who resigned from the board of Mainzeal Group Ltd. MPCL and Mainzeal Group Limited are part of the Richina group, controlled and majority owned by Yan Ci Lang (also known as Richard Yan). Mainzeal went into liquidation on 28 February 2013, owing some NZ$110 million. In May 2015, the receiver of Mainzeal, BDO, filed a civil lawsuit against the former Mainzeal directors, including Shipley, for an alleged breach of directors' duties. In February 2019, the High Court of New Zealand found that the Mainzeal directors had breached their duty to avoid reckless trading and assessed their total liability at NZ$36 million, of which Shipley's share was assessed at NZ$6 million. Within a week of the Court delivering its verdict, Shipley resigned from her Chair of the China Construction Bank New Zealand. An appeal against this judgment was filed along with a counter claim brought by the original plaintiffs for a vastly higher award against the Directors. Both appeals failed.

Shipley accepted redesignation as a Dame Companion of the New Zealand Order of Merit on 14 August 2009, following the reintroduction of titular honours by the Fifth National Government. Also in 2009, Shipley appeared on an episode of the television reality/travel show Intrepid Journeys, where she visited Namibia. She later started a charity to help a school she came across on that trip called the Namibian Educational Trust. Shipley chairs Global Women NZ, and is Patron of the Sir Edmund Hillary Outdoor Pursuits Centre and the New Zealand National Heart Foundation's campaign "Go Red for Women".

References

External links

 Prime Minister's Office biography, primeminister.govt.nz; accessed 18 June 2015.
 Profile, GlobalWomen.org.nz; accessed 18 June 2015.

|-

|-

|-

|-

|-

|-

|-

|-

1952 births
20th-century New Zealand politicians
20th-century women rulers
Living people
Prime Ministers of New Zealand
Leaders of the Opposition (New Zealand)
New Zealand MPs for South Island electorates
New Zealand National Party leaders
New Zealand National Party MPs
People educated at Marlborough Girls' College
People from Ashburton, New Zealand
People from Gore, New Zealand
Female heads of government in New Zealand
Women members of the New Zealand House of Representatives
Women opposition leaders
Women government ministers of New Zealand
Dames Companion of the New Zealand Order of Merit
New Zealand members of the Privy Council of the United Kingdom
Recipients of the New Zealand Suffrage Centennial Medal 1993
21st-century New Zealand politicians
21st-century New Zealand women politicians
Christchurch College of Education alumni
Women prime ministers
20th-century New Zealand women politicians